St John Rigby College may refer to:

 St John Rigby College, Wigan, Wigan, England
 All Saints Catholic School, West Wickham - formerly known as such but then renamed